Mortimer Daniel Costello (8 July 1936 — 8 August 2012) was an English footballer who played as a wing half.

Career
Costello began his career at Leytonstone, before signing for Aldershot in 1956. Costello remained at Aldershot for a single season, signing for Southend United in 1957. At Southend, Costello played 266 times in all competitions, scoring 15 goals. In 1965, Costello signed for fellow Essex club Chelmsford City. During his time at Chelmsford, Costello made 287 appearances, winning the 1967–68 Southern League in the process.

References

1936 births
2012 deaths
Association football wingers
English footballers
Footballers from Dagenham
Leytonstone F.C. players
Aldershot F.C. players
Southend United F.C. players
Chelmsford City F.C. players
English Football League players
Southern Football League players